Chippewa Correctional Facility (URF) is a prison for men located in the Upper Peninsula (UP) of Michigan and part of the Michigan Department of Corrections (MDOC). The 3 letter designation for this facility is URF.

General
The Chippewa Correctional Facility houses inmates with a security level of I, II, and IV.  The facility contains 120 beds for security level I inmates, 720 beds for security level II inmates, 192 beds for security level IV inmates, 22 beds for the detention unit, and 96 beds for an administrative segregation unit.

History
The facility opened in 1989. On August 9, 2009, the Straits Correctional Facility was closed and consolidated into the Chippewa Correctional Facility.

In August 2006, a small twin-engine plane crashed near the prison, hitting a fence approximately  outside the facility's secure perimeter. While no one at the prison was injured, all four people on board the plane were killed in the crash.

Directions
From I-75 exit onto M-80 (Kinross).  The prison is located on the right side of the road.

See also

 List of Michigan state prisons

References

External links
Chippewa Correctional Facility (URF)

1989 establishments in Michigan
Buildings and structures in Chippewa County, Michigan
Prisons in Michigan